Dzhuryn is a town in the Zhmerynka Raion of Vinnytsia Oblast in Ukraine. Dzhuryn hosts the administration of Dzhuryn settlement hromada, one of the hromadas of Ukraine.

Until 18 July 2020, Kopaigorod belonged to Sharhorod Raion. The raion was abolished in July 2020 as part of the administrative reform of Ukraine, which reduced the number of raions of Vinnytsia Oblast to six. The area of Sharhorod Raion was merged into Zhmerynka Raion.

References

Villages in Zhmerynka Raion